Leo Joseph Postman (June 7, 1918 – April 22, 2004) was a Russian-born American psychologist known for his research on human memory.

Career 
He taught at the University of California, Berkeley from 1950 to his retirement in 1987. In 1961, he founded Berkeley's Institute of Human Learning, which later became the Institute for Cognitive and Brain Sciences. He was a member of the National Academy of Sciences and the American Psychological Association, as well as the president of the Western Psychological Association in 1968.

In 1974, he was awarded the Warren Medal from the Society of Experimental Psychologists.

Death and legacy 
He died of heart failure at his home in Marblehead, Massachusetts on April 22, 2004. His 2005 obituary in American Psychologist described him as "one of the most prolific psychologists of the last century".

See also 

 Gordon Allport – Postman's teacher

References

Further reading

Soviet emigrants to the United States
1918 births
2004 deaths
City College of New York alumni
Members of the United States National Academy of Sciences
Fellows of the American Psychological Association
20th-century American psychologists
Experimental psychologists
Memory researchers
University of California, Berkeley faculty
Harvard University alumni